The Lérez is a river in South West Galicia, Spain. The river meets the Atlantic Ocean at Pontevedra, where it creates Pontevedra's ria. The Lérez passes through the communities of Forcarei, Cerdedo, Campo Lameiro, Cotobade and, finally, Pontevedra.

Its main tributaries are the Salgueiro, Cabaleiros, Grande, O Castro, Quireza, Tenorio and Almofrei.

See also 
 List of rivers of Spain
 Rivers of Galicia

Rivers of Spain
Rivers of Galicia (Spain)